Shindgaon is a village in India. It is situated in the Mawal taluka of Pune district in the state of Maharashtra.

Administration
The village is administrated by a sarpanch, an elected representative who leads a gram panchayat. At the time of the 2011 Census of India, the gram panchayat governed five villages and was based at Ambegaon.

Demography 
At the 2011 census, the village comprised 35 households. The population of 160 was split between 82 males and 78 females.

See also
List of villages in Mawal taluka

References

Villages in Mawal taluka